Gertrude Rachel Levy  (5 November 1883 – 10 October 1966) was a British author and cultural historian writing about comparative mythology, matriarchy, epic poetry and archaeology.  She published many of her works under the name "G. Rachel Levy".

Early life and education
Levy was born in Aliwal North, Cape Colony, to Jewish parents Benjamin Levy, a German emigrant, and his wife, Florence Beaver, from Manchester. Her father was a bead and glass merchant born in Posen. Her maternal grandfather, Louis Beaver, emigrated from Prussia and married Staffordshire-born Rachel Mayer. The family moved to England when she was young and she grew up in Kensington.

Levy earned an M.A. in Classics in 1924 from the University of London, and worked from 1926 to 1928 with the Department of Antiquities in Mandatory Palestine.

Career
From 1930 to 1936, Levy was associated with an expedition to Iraq, sponsored by the University of Chicago. Later in life she lived in London, where from 1939 to 1949 she was the librarian of the Joint Library of the Hellenic and Roman Societies.
The Society of Antiquaries of London elected her as a Fellow in 1947.

As did Alexander Marshack, but earlier, Levy made an observation to the effect that in the earliest known representations of humans and animals together, the humans are shown without weapons. To the theory of hero archetypes, she contributed in The Sword from the Rock a three-phase evolutionary pattern, considered neglected by Brown and Fishwick: creation narratives, then quest pattern, then fraternal conflict. Theodore Ziolkowski states that Levy included much of ancient epic in the works that can be traced back to ritual. Eleazar M. Meletinsky writes

[...] the monumental epics of agrarian civilizations undoubtedly use models linked to seasonal rites [...] On this point, Levy's work is interesting, despite its exaggerations, and goes beyond Murray's pioneering efforts.

Levy was an influence on Northrop Frye, as he himself acknowledged, and references to her work are common in his "Third Book" and "Late" notebooks.

Works

The Gate of Horn: A Study of the Religious Concepts of the Stone Age, and Their Influence upon European Thought (1948; republished 1963, Faber & Faber)
The Sword from the Rock: An Investigation into the Origins of Epic Literature and the Development of the Hero (1953)
The Violet Crown: An Athenian Autobiography (1954)
Plato in Sicily (1956)
The Phoenix' Nest: A Study in Religious Transformations (1961)

Levy also edited The Myths of Plato (1905) by John Alexander Stewart for a 1960 edition, with revisions, translation of Greek text, and an introduction.

References

External links
 The Dying God and the Beginnings of Epic Literature, BBC Third Programme, 7 May 1952 18.45
 Missing archaeological artefacts linking Malta to ancient world, Times of Malta, June 16, 2002 by Natalino Fenech, discusses theories of Levy and Henri Frankfort on the culture of ancient Malta
 Interview comments from John Heath-Stubbs

1883 births
1966 deaths
British women writers
British non-fiction writers
Fellows of the Society of Antiquaries of London
British expatriates in Mandatory Palestine
British expatriates in Iraq
British Jews
British people of German-Jewish descent
Alumni of the University of London
20th-century non-fiction writers
Emigrants from Cape Colony to the United Kingdom